Tanygrisiau is a village and area within Blaenau Ffestiniog in the upper end of the Vale of Ffestiniog in the county of Gwynedd, north-west Wales. It can be found along the southern side of the Moelwyn mountain range and dates to around 1750. The village itself has a population of around 350.

Geography
The Moelwyns protect the village from much of the wind from northerly gales in the winter and give the village a pleasant southerly aspect with relatively mild weather considering its location high in Snowdonia. However rainfall in the upper end of the Ffestiniog valley can be very high all year around.

Industrial Past and Present
Tanygrisiau, or more properly 'Tan y grisiau', is Welsh for "below the steps", referring to the stepped cliffs above the village. Tanygrisiau was famous for its slate mining, producing a high quality black slate that was used across the world. The major quarries above the village were Cwmorthin, Wrysgan and Conglog.

Tanygrisiau railway station is on the Ffestiniog Railway, a narrow gauge railway built to carry slate from the mines down to the sea at Porthmadog where it was shipped all around the world, mostly for use in roofing.

The nearby Ffestiniog power station, the high Stwlan Dam and Llyn Ystradau, colloquially known as Tanygrisiau Reservoir, are part of a pumped storage hydroelectricity installation. Much nearer the railway station is a waterfall on the Afon Cwmorthin and below the falls, and powered by a different water source, is a very small hydro-electric power station.

The closure of the slate mines during the late 1970s led to massive depopulation of the area from which it has only recently (2005) begun to recover.

Tanygrisiau has close links with the regiment of the Royal Welch Fusiliers.

Language
Welsh is the predominant language of the area and the medium of instruction in all local schools.

Leisure
The village is a starting point for walks into the Moelwyns, especially if the intention is to climb Moelwyn itself. Care should be taken as there are numerous mine shafts in the area.

As a result of the slate mining, when the Snowdonia National Park was created, Tanygrisiau, Manod and Blaenau Ffestiniog were left outside, thus creating a doughnut-shaped area excluded from the National Park.

Gallery

Notable residents
Gai Toms music artist

Noted former residents
 Gwyn Thomas, Welsh poet, academic and the present National Poet for Wales, was born in Tanygrisiau in 1936.  As a boy, his family then moved to Blaenau Ffestiniog.
 Meredydd Evans (born Llanegryn, Wales 1919) was a collector, editor, historian and notable performer of folk music of Wales.

References

External links

Landscape photographs in and around Blaenau Ffestiniog
geograph.co.uk, photos of Tanygrisiau and surrounding area

Villages in Gwynedd
Mining communities in Wales
Ffestiniog